Vitaly Viktorovich Bakhmetyev (born August 12, 1961, Magnitogorsk, Chelyabinsk Oblast) is a Russian political figure, deputy of the 7th and 8th State Duma convocations. He was born in the family of metallurgists. Later he graduated from the Magnitogorsk State Technical University. In 1984 he started working at the Magnitogorsk Iron and Steel Works, and eight years later, he headed the metal forming and foundry workshop of the plant.

In 2005 Bakhmetyev was elected as a deputy to the Magnitogorsk City Council of the 3rd convocation, where he was allocated to the committee on budget and fiscal policies. Three years later, Bakhmetyev became the commercial director for material and technical resources of the Magnitogorsk Iron and Steel Works. In 2012, he was among the confidants of Vladimir Putin in the Russian presidential election. In 2015 Bakhmetyev was appointed the Mayor of Magnitogorsk; he left the post on September 27, 2016, as he was elected to the State Duma of the 7th convocation. He continued his service as a deputy in the 8th State Duma. He ran with the United Russia.

Vitaly Bakhmetyev is married and has three children.

Awards 

 Medal of the Order "For Merit to the Fatherland" (2003)
 Miner's Glory Medal

References

1961 births
Living people
People from Magnitogorsk
United Russia politicians
21st-century Russian politicians
Mayors of places in Russia
Seventh convocation members of the State Duma (Russian Federation)
Eighth convocation members of the State Duma (Russian Federation)